The 97th Regiment Illinois Volunteer Infantry was an infantry regiment that served in the Union Army during the American Civil War. It was instrumental in the Federal campaign to reclaim the Mississippi River for the Union, participating in the siege of Vicksburg and battles leading up to it in Mississippi. Moving down the river after the siege, it participated in efforts to wrest control of the bayou area, then retake Mobile Bay, culminating in the bloody Battle of Fort Blakeley hours after Lee's surrender at Appomattox.

Service
The 97th Illinois Infantry was organized at Camp Butler, Illinois and mustered into Federal service on September 16, 1862.

The regiment was mustered out on July 29, 1865.

Total strength and casualties
The regiment suffered 2 officers and 28 enlisted men who were killed in action or who died of their wounds and 200 enlisted men who died of disease, for a total of 233 fatalities.

Commanders
Colonel Friend S. Rutherford - resigned due to illness on June 15, 1864, and died of disease 5 days later.
Colonel Lewis D. Martin
Lieutenant Colonel Victor Vifquain - Mustered out with the regiment on Jul 29, 1865.

Notable members
 Sergeant Carlos W. Colby – Company G — Participating in a diversionary "forlorn hope" attack on Confederate defenses, 22 May 1863.
 Sergeant David Dickie – Company A — Participating in a diversionary "forlorn hope" attack on Confederate defenses, 22 May 1863.

See also
List of Illinois Civil War Units
Illinois in the American Civil War

Notes

References

The Civil War Archive
 Davis, Cameron, Confluence: Genoir of an American Family
  *

External links
 A Forlorn Hope
 Vicksburg Medal of Honor Recipients

Units and formations of the Union Army from Illinois
1862 establishments in Illinois
Military units and formations established in 1862
Military units and formations disestablished in 1865